The Turia is a right tributary of the river Cașin in Romania. It flows into the Cașin in the city Târgu Secuiesc.

Tributaries

The following rivers are tributaries to the river Turia (from source to mouth):

Left: Boroș (Valea Gorganului), Muncaci, Caratna
Right: Pârâul Mărului, Pârâul Peștilor (Iaidon), Valea Prunilor (Pârâul Întunecat)

References

Rivers of Romania
Rivers of Covasna County